The County of Mackenzie is a county (a cadastral division) in Queensland, Australia, located in the Wide Bay–Burnett region. It was named after Robert Ramsay Mackenzie, who served as Premier of Queensland in 1867–1868 and was also member for Burnett, it was formally named and bounded by the Governor in Council on 7 March 1901 under the Land Act 1897.

Parishes
Mackenzie is divided into parishes, as listed below:

References

Mackenzie

External links